Marco Spoletini (born 13 April 1964) is an Italian film editor.

Born in Rome, Spoletini graduated from the Istituto di Stato per la Cinematografia Roberto Rossellini, then he enrolled at the Centro Sperimentale di Cinematografia, where he studied film editing under Roberto Perpignani. He is well known for his association with Matteo Garrone, with whom he worked since his first short film.

In 2003 Spoletini won the Silver Ribbon and the Ciak d'oro for his work in the films  The Embalmer and Maximum Velocity (V-Max). In 2009 he won the David di Donatello for Garrone's Gomorrah.

References

External links

1964 births
Italian film editors
Living people
Film people from Rome
David di Donatello winners
Nastro d'Argento winners
Ciak d'oro winners
Centro Sperimentale di Cinematografia alumni